The College Conference of Illinois and Wisconsin (CCIW) is a college athletic conference which competes in the Division III level of the National Collegiate Athletic Association (NCAA).

CCIW schools have accounted for 50 national championships in NCAA Division III competition, including 15 in men's cross country; six in men's basketball; six in men's outdoor track and field; five in football; four in men's indoor track and field; three in women's soccer; two in women's outdoor track and field, women's basketball, men's soccer, men’s golf, and men's volleyball; and one apiece in baseball and  women's indoor track and field.

Elmhurst College won a pair of Division III women's volleyball championships (1983 and 1985), and North Central College won a women's basketball title (1983) before the conference began sponsorship of women's athletics in 1986–87.

North Central men's cross country won its 13th national title in program history during the fall of 2009, while the North Central men's indoor track and field team captured the 2010 national championship. The Cardinals made their clean sweep by winning the men's outdoor track and field title in the spring of 2010. In addition, the Illinois Wesleyan women's outdoor track and field team, as well as the baseball team, took home national titles, giving the CCIW five national championships during the 2009–10 season.

North Central defended its titles in men's indoor track and field and outdoor track and field in the spring of 2011 while the Cardinals won their second men's cross country title in three seasons in the fall of 2011 and their third-straight indoor track and field title in 2012. Illinois Wesleyan won the conference's second women's basketball national title in 2012. 

In 2019 Illinois Wesleyan Men’s Golf won their first National Championship. They followed that up with a second National Championship in 2021 after a one year break due to the COVID-19 outbreak in 2020. Coached by Jim Ott to both Championships and led by Drew Pershing and Ben Johnson in 2019 and Jimmy Morton, Andrew Abel and Rob Wuethrich in 2021. 

North Central Football won the 2019 National Championship and, after the COVID year of 2020 in which no championship was held, finished second in the nation in 2021.

Carthage won consecutive men's volleyball titles in 2021 and 2022.

History

The conference was formed with nine charter members (Augustana College, Carthage College, Elmhurst College, Illinois College, Illinois Wesleyan University, Lake Forest College, Millikin University, North Central College and Wheaton College) on April 26, 1946, in Jacksonville, Illinois, and opened competition in the 1946–47 academic year as the College Conference of Illinois. In 1967, the name was changed to the College Conference of Illinois and Wisconsin to recognize Carthage, which moved to Kenosha, Wisconsin in 1962, and Carroll University, which entered the conference in 1955.

The CCIW sponsors 25 sports: baseball, men's and women's basketball, women's bowling, men's and women's cross country, football, men's and women's golf, men's and women's lacrosse, men's and women's soccer, softball, men's and women's swimming, men's and women's tennis, men's and women's indoor track and field, men's and women's outdoor track and field, men's and women's volleyball and wrestling. The most recently added sports are men's volleyball, which started play in the 2020 season, (2019–20 school year), bowling, which started play in 2020–21. and women's wrestling added for 2022–23 season.

CCIW membership has experienced several changes since its inception. After Carthage left in 1952, Illinois College withdrew the following year (1953). Elmhurst and Wheaton withdrew following the 1959–60 academic year. Wheaton re-joined for all sports but football in 1967 (and for football in 1970). Elmhurst re-joined in the fall of 1967 for all sports but football (and for football in 1968). Carroll joined during the 1955 spring sports season (1954-55 academic season). Carthage returned in the fall of 1961, and North Park University entered the following fall (1962). Lake Forest dropped out at the end of the 1962–63 academic year. The last member to leave the CCIW was Carroll following the 1991–92 academic year. Carroll returned to the CCIW in 2016. In 2007, Rose–Hulman Institute of Technology, located in Terre Haute, Indiana, joined the CCIW as an associate member for men's and women's swimming. After 2017, Rose–Hulman left as an associate member shortly before its full-time home of the Heartland Collegiate Athletic Conference (HCAC) announced it would add swimming.

The CCIW lost one affiliate member and gained two in 2020. Greenville University, which had moved its men's volleyball program from the single-sport Midwest Collegiate Volleyball League to the CCIW in 2019–20, downgraded the sport from varsity to club status after that school year. With the addition of bowling, Lakeland University, a wrestling affiliate since 2016–17, added bowling to its CCIW membership, while Aurora University and Marian University became affiliates in that sport.

Chronological timeline
 1946 - On April 26, 1946, the CCIW was founded as the College Conference of Illinois (CCI). Charter members included Augustana College of Illinois, Carthage College, Elmhurst College, Illinois College, Illinois Wesleyan College (now Illinois Wesleyan University), Lake Forest University (now Lake Forest College), Millikin College (now Millikin University), North Central College and Wheaton College, effective beginning the 1946-47 academic year.
 1952 - Carthage left the CCI, effective after the 1951-52 academic year.
 1963 - Illinois College left the CCI, effective after the 1952-53 academic year.
 1955 - Carroll College of Wisconsin (now Carroll University) joined the CCI, effective in the 1995-56 academic year.
 1960 - Elmhurst and Wheaton left the CCI, effective after the 1959-60 academic year.
 1961 - Carthage re-joined back to the CCI, effective in the 1961-62 academic year.
 1962 - North Park College (now North Park University) joined the CCI, effective in the 1962-63 academic year.
 1963 - Lake Forest left the CCI, effective after the 1962-63 academic year.
 1967 - The CCI has been rebranded as the College Conference of Illinois and Wisconsin (CCIW), effective in the 1967-68 academic year.
 1967 - Elmhurst and Wheaton re-joined back to the CCIW, effective in the 1967-68 academic year. Elmhurst later re-joined back for football for the 1968 fall season while Wheaton did the same for the 1970 fall season.
 1992 - Carroll (Wisc.) left the CCIW to join the Midwest Conference (MWC), effective after the 1991-92 academic year.
 2016 - Carroll (Wisc.) re-joined back to the CCIW, effective in the 2016-17 academic year.
 2007 - Rose–Hulman Institute of Technology joined the CCIW as an affiliate member for swimming, effective in the 2007-08 academic year.
 2014 - The University of Dubuque joined the CCIW as an affiliate member for men's and women's lacrosse, effective in the 2015 spring season (2014-15 academic year).
 2016 - Concordia University of Wisconsin, Lakeland University and the Milwaukee School of Engineering joined the CCIW as affiliate members for wrestling, effective in the 2016-17 academic year.
 2017 - Rose–Hulman left the CCIW as an affiliate member for swimming, effective after the 2016-17 academic year.
 2018 - Two institutions joined the CCIW as affiliate members: The University of Chicago for women's lacrosse, and Washington University in St. Louis for football, both effective in the 2018-19 academic year.
 2020 - Dubuque left the CCIW as an affiliate member for women's lacrosse as the school announced that it would drop the sport, effective after the 2019 spring season (2018-19 academic year).
 2019 - Greenville University and Loras College joined the CCIW as affiliate members for men's volleyball, effective in the 2020 spring season (2019-20 academic year).
 2020 - Greenville left the CCIW as an affiliate member for men's volleyball as the school announced that it would drop the sport, effective after the 2020 spring season (2019-20 academic year).
 2020 - Aurora University and Marian University of Wisconsin joined the CCIW as affiliate members for bowling, effective in the 2021 spring season (2020-21 academic year).
 2021 - Dubuque left the CCIW as an affiliate member for men's lacrosse to join the Midwest Lacrosse Conference (MLC), effective after the 2021 spring season (2020-21 academic year).
 2021 - Transylvania University joined the CCIW as an affiliate member for men's lacrosse, effective in the 2022 spring season (2021-22 academic year).

Member schools
Throughout its history, all CCIW members, whether full or affiliate, have been private schools.

Current members

Notes

Affiliate members
The CCIW currently has nine affiliate members.

Former members
The CCIW has two former full members.

Former affiliate members
The CCIW has two former affiliate members.

Notes

Membership timeline

Sports

In 2015, men's and women's lacrosse were added as sanctioned sports by the CCIW. The CCIW announced the inclusion of men's volleyball for the 2020 season (2019–20 school year), with bowling (an NCAA sport for women only) added in 2020–21. Women's wrestling became the newest conference sport in 2022–23.

The CCIW sponsors championships in the following sports:

National championships

References

External links
 

 
College sports in Illinois
College sports in Wisconsin